Cheil Industries FC is a defunct South Korean semi-professional football club that was located in Daegu, South Korea. The club played at the highest level in South Korea in the 1960s, winning the national league on three occasions and the national cup twice.

Background
Cheil Industries FC was founded in April 1962 by Cheil Industries of Samsung Group, and was based in Daegu in south-eastern Korea.   The club competed in the Korea Semi-Professional Football League which at that time was the highest level league in the South Korean football league system. Many works, banks and military sides competed in the league which was run with Spring and Autumn stages each year. League records indicate that Cheil Industries shared the title in Spring 1964 after winning Group A and then drawing 0–0 with Keumseong Textile Company FC in the final at the Dongdaemun Stadium, Seoul on the 14 July 1964.

The club were also joint winners in Autumn 1968, this time with Army Logistics Command FC, and finished runners-up in Autumn 1967. They finally won the competition outright in Spring 1970 a year before the club disbanded. The club won the national cup competition, the Korean National Football Championship, in 1966 and 1967. The club also won the Korean President's Cup National Football Tournament in 1963 and 1967 and were runners-up in 1968.

The club was disbanded in December 1971 but during its short 9-year history it was  one of the leading sides in South Korea, featuring players such as Kim Ho, Moon Jung-Sik and Park Byung-Joo. In 1964 Cheil Industries provided three players, Kim Hong-Bok, Cha Tae-Sung and Lee Yi-Woo, for the South Korea Olympics squad in Tokyo. Other Cheil Industries players that represented their country were  Chung Soon-Choon, Lee Joon-Ok, Seo Yoon-Cha, An Won-Nam and Hong In-Woong.  The club was affiliated to the Korea Football Association.

Honours
 Korea Semi-Professional Football League :
 Champions (3): 1964s, 1968a, 1970s
Runners-up (1): 1967a
 Korean National Football Championship (Former FA Cup):
 Champions (2): 1966, 1967
 Korean President's Cup National Football Tournament :
 Champions (2): 1963, 1967
Runners-up (1): 1968

Notable players
Cheil Industries FC players that have played in the South Korea national team include:

 An Won-Nam
 Cha Tae-Sung
 Chung Soon-Choon
 Hong In-Woong

 Kim Jae-Han
 Kim Ho
 Kim Hong-Bok
 Lee Joon-Ok

 Lee Yi-Woo
 Moon Jung-Sik
 Park Byung-Joo
 Seo Yoon-Cha

References

See also
List of South Korean football champions
List of Korean FA Cup winners

S
S
Samsung
1962 establishments in South Korea
1971 disestablishments in South Korea
Works association football clubs in South Korea